Goodsprings Cemetery may refer to:

 Goodsprings Cemetery (Alabama)
 Goodsprings Cemetery (Nevada)
 Goodsprings Cemetery (Tennessee)

See also
 Good Spring Baptist Church and Cemetery, in Kentucky